Errigoiti is a town and municipality located in the province of Biscay, in the autonomous community of Basque Country, northern Spain.

Composition 
Errigoitia municipality consists of several neighborhoods. It has the peculiarity that the parish church is located outside the urban core, near the cemetery. The old school and the shrine of San Antonio and some villages, form the Eleizalde neighborhood.
The neighborhoods that make up the municipality, and their populations, are:

 Atxikas-Rekalde (57) 
 Eleizalde-Olabarri (159)
 Metxikas (117)
 Uria (178)

References

External links
 ERRIGOITI in the Bernardo Estornés Lasa - Auñamendi Encyclopedia (Euskomedia Fundazioa) 

Municipalities in Biscay